Charles Robert Turner (24 March 1916 – 10 January 1993) was a Liberal party member of the House of Commons of Canada and later became a member of the Senate of Canada. Born in Toronto, Ontario, he became a locomotive engineer by career.

Turner represented the Ontario riding of London East at which he was elected in 1968 and re-elected in 1972, 1974, 1979 and 1980. During his terms in the House of Commons, Turner served as a Parliamentary Secretary, as Deputy Chairman of the Committee of the Whole (an Assistant Deputy Speaker) and finally as Chief Government Whip from 1980 to 1984.

After serving five successive terms from the 28th to 32nd Canadian Parliaments, he was appointed to the Senate in 1984 as recommended by Prime Minister John Turner.

External links
 

1916 births
1993 deaths
Canadian senators from Ontario
Liberal Party of Canada MPs
Liberal Party of Canada senators
Members of the House of Commons of Canada from Ontario
Politicians from London, Ontario
Politicians from Toronto